Puh is a Slovene surname, sometimes Germanized to 'Puch'. Notable people with the surname include:

Dušan Puh (born 1951), Slovenian windsurfer
Janez Puh (1862–1914), Slovenian inventor and mechanic

See also
Puch (disambiguation)

Slovene-language surnames